The Outcast Riders are UCI Pro-Elite Riders, whose partners give up or been removed from the Cape Epic. From 2010 until 2017 these riders worn the  Outcast jersey, since the 2018 Cape Epic they wear the Leopard jersey.

History
Kashi Leuchs lost his partner at the 2009 Cape Epic. He suggested the idea of the Outcast riders.

The organizers thought it's a great idea and implemented the new modus at the 2010 version.

Rules
It's not allowed to ride behind the Outcast Riders for all other riders.
It's not allowed to assist any team with podium ambitions.
They have to wear the official jersey.

Former riders

2010
no information

2011

2012
no information

2013

2014

2015

2016
no information

2017
no information

2018

2019

References

Cape Epic classifications and awards
Cycling jerseys